The J. V. Vandenberge House at 301 N. Vine in Victoria, Texas, United States was built in 1908.  It was a work of architect Jules Leffland.  It was listed on the National Register of Historic Places in 1986.

It has been termed an "outstanding example" of Leffland's work.

See also

National Register of Historic Places listings in Victoria County, Texas

References

External links

Houses completed in 1908
Houses in Victoria, Texas
Houses on the National Register of Historic Places in Texas
Neoclassical architecture in Texas
National Register of Historic Places in Victoria, Texas
1908 establishments in Texas